Red Terror (Greek: Ερυθρά or Κόκκινη Τρομοκρατία)  is a term used by some historians to describe incidents of violence against civilians, by EAM (which was directed mainly by the KKE) from approximately 1942 or 1943 until the end of the Greek Civil War in 1949. In the countryside, operations were conducted by the ELAS; in cities, by the Organization for the Protection of the People's Struggle (OPLA).

The discourse about "red terrorism" was first formulated during the German Occupation as part of the anti-EAM propaganda of the occupying forces and their Greek collaborators. Later it was adopted by a British commission which mediated between EAM-ELAS and the Greek authorities soon after the end of German occupation. After the Greek Civil War it became a key interpretive scheme in the right-wing historiography.

History 
During the Axis occupation of Greece, acts of violence by EAM and ELAS against leaders and members of other resistance organizations occurred in Northern Greece, Achaea, Messenia, Elis and elsewhere. Acts that could be described as "terrorist", started in Macedonia in April 1943. The leaders of the minor resistance group PΑO (accused of collaboration with the Germans) were executed. Officers of the Greek Army were arrested and executed in Phocis (Central Greece), accused for “non-resistance to Italians” and being “counter-revolutionaries”, but were not accused for collaboration with the enemy. Other executions with political motivations took place in Kastoria ΕΑΜ preferred the method of abduction and execution of victims far from their place, by persons who didn't know the victims. In February 1944, when German occupying forces with Greek collaborators intruded an EAM base, a mass grave of non-communists was discovered near a Macedonian village. Three person cooperating with a British intelligence network surveying German and Bulgarian occupation forces in Chalkidiki were executed, probably accused of acting against EAM. According to Mark Mazower (based on a testimony of a British soldier), on the mountains of the Delphi area, ELAS arrested and executed citizens on the grounds that they were collaborating with the British mission, arguing that "this action [collaboration] means that they are Gestapo agents". A British army officer noted in early September 1944 that terrorism prevailed in Attica and Boeotia, while another British officer wrote: "Over 500 persons have been executed in a few weeks. Due to the smell of the unburied, access is almost impossible. Naked bodies are laid unburied, shot on their heads".

After the occupation
German forces evacuated Greece by the end of 1944. Acts of red terrorism intensified in Macedonia soon after. However, EAM avoided action against Slavophone resistance organizations, while it managed to include in its ranks many Slav former quislings. This policy was probably due to the fact that the EAM wanted to win allies in the upcoming battle against the Greek government of Georgios Papandreou. Many prisoners of the EAM in Macedonia were released after the Dekemvriana in Athens, but executions did not totally cease. ΕΑΜ operated concentration camps in Macedonia. Hundreds of civilians were forced to march from the cities of Kastoria and Florina to the camps, some of them accused of anglophilia.

In January 1945 ELAS forces in Lakka of Souli in Epirus mass executed unarmed former resistance fighters of EDES, members of their families (including children and women), other civilians, totally 85 persons from the neighbouring villages.

Use of the term 
The term “Red Terror(ism)” was already used in 1944 by Greek anticommunists and by the German-controlled counterinsurgency force during the Occupation, the Security Battalions.

The term was also adopted by the British Citrine Commission, which attempted to mediate between ELAS and the British Forces who intervened in Greece after the Dekemvriana. The Commission was asking for the release of some thousands of hostages held by the ELAS, but did not mention the preventive arrest of 20,000 EAM members, and the fate of others held by the British authorities in Egypt. The pro-EAM fighters of the Greek Armed Forces in the Middle East had earlier participated in a mutiny within this corps. Reference to "Red Terror" was made by the newly appointed Prime Minister of the Greek government-in-exile, Georgios Papandreou, in the Lebanon Conference (May 1944). In April 1944 ELAS attacked the social-democratic resistance organization ΕΚΚΑ (the military wing of which was the 5/42 Evzone Regiment) that was commanded by Colonel Dimitrios Psarros. The outnumbered 5/42 Regiment was defeated and Psarros was arrested and assassinated by ELAS, an event which rallied opposition to EAM. Νevertheless, according to most of historians, the assassination was not political, but was due to personal reasons. According to a different view, the assassination was ordered by a high-rank member of EAM-ELAS and carried out by an EAM-ELAS officer who was a trusted person of the KKE General Secretary Georgios Siantos.

In modern historiography

Generally accepted view 
Supporters of EAM and most of the historians consider EAM the main resistance movement (among with EDES) during the war and believe that these manifestations of violence are mainly due to the personalities and the particular zeal of local EAM executives. Manolis Glezos, politician and former ΚΚΕ member, admitted claimed that ELAS “did some killing” out of revenge, but this was officially forbidden by the organization's principles.

"New Wave" historiography 
Stathis Kalyvas, the main representative of the "New Wave" historiography, believes that "red terrorism" was centrally organized, and was carried out by the local organs of the KKE and the EAM, and had strong characteristics of a bureaucratic mechanism with division of labor. According to Kalyvas, during the German occupation of Greece and after the establishment of the Greek National Liberation Front (EAM) in 1942, the latter targeted and executed not only Greek collaborators but also its potent political adversaries. Stathis Kalyvas separates "terrorism" from "violence". He notes that terror does not necessarily mean a lot of violence, but contrary, the successful terrorism produces little violence.

Historian Hagen Fleischer criticized Kalyvas’ view for methodological errors.

References

Bibliography 

Kallianiotis Athanasios, Οι πρόσφυγες στη Δυτική Μακεδονία (1941 - 1946), 2007

1940s in Greece
Greek Civil War
Political violence in Greece
National Liberation Front (Greece)